Fathy El Shazly (born May 21, 1943) Egyptian diplomat and politician, the Director of the Executive Secretariat for the Demining & Development of the North West Coast.

Life 

He was born in Cairo to a middle-class family. He was the son of Sheick Abdel Hamid M. El Shazly, professor of Al Hadith at Al Azhar University and Diaa A. Zahran. He graduated in 1964 from the faculty of commerce at Ain Shams University. 

Fathy El Shazly is the married father of 3 sons and grandfather of 2 girls.

Career

Diplomat 

El Shazly joined the Ministry of Foreign Affairs on 1 June 1965. He served in Egyptian Embassies at Bamako,  Caracas, Stockholm and Addis Ababa, where he acted as Egypt's alternate representative to the Organisation of African Unity and to the Economic Commission for Africa, the UN branch for Africa.

He was appointed Ambassador to Saudi Arabia in 1991 and was Assistant Foreign Minister for European Affairs between 1995 and 1999.

He was the first national coordinator for the Egypt Euro/Mediterranean Partnership, between 1996 and 1999. He was Ambassador to the Republic of Turkey from November 1999 to March 2003.

He retired from the diplomatic service in June 2003, but in the fall of 2004 he was made advisor to the Minister of International Cooperation, working on Egypt's relationship with the European Union and the promotion of human rights.

Egypt Mine Action 

In early 2007 he began directing Egypt/UNDP Mine action in the North West Coast of Egypt, working to mitigate the heavy contamination explosive remnants of World War II to open areas for mineral development.

References 

Living people
1943 births
Diplomats from Cairo
Ain Shams University alumni
Ambassadors of Egypt to Saudi Arabia